Brigadier Richard Otto, is a military officer in the Uganda People's Defence Forces (UPDF). He is the commanding officer of the third army division of the UPDF, based in Moroto. He was appointed to that position in May 2017. Before that, he served as the commander of the UPDF contingent in the Central African Republic, as part of the African Union Regional Task Force (AU-RTF), the regional counter-offensive against the Lord's Resistance Army (LRA).

Background
He was born in the Northern Region of Uganda in the 1960s

Overview
The regional task force to neutralise (kill or capture) the Ugandan fugitive Joseph Kony was established in 2012. The force was supposed to be 5,000 troops strong, with units from the African countries terrorised by Kony and his guerilla force, the LRA. Brigadier Dick Olum, at the rank of colonel, was selected as first commander of that force.

However, the force turned out to be composed entirely of Ugandan soldiers. The other countries, South Sudan, Democratic Republic of the Congo and Central African Republic, beset by domestic instability and in some cases outright civil war, were unable to send troops or quickly withdrew the ones assigned to the mission. The mission failed to secure donor funding and Uganda ended up funding the entire mission on its own.

Later, Richard Otto, at the rank of colonel took command of the Anti-LRA troops. They were joined by a 100-troops strong contingent from the United States military in non combative roles. In April 2017, the mission was closed and the Ugandan and American troops were relocated to other missions.

In October 2017, the president of Uganda and commander-in-chief sent Richard Otto, now at the rank of Brigadier to replace Dick Prit Olum as the head of the UPDF third division, in Moroto. Olum was dispatched to Kinshasa, as Uganda's Defence Attache to DR Congo.

See also
List of military schools in Uganda

References

People from Northern Region, Uganda
Living people
Ugandan military personnel
Year of birth missing (living people)